Mamunuru is a small seaside village in Khammam district, Andhra Pradesh, India. In the village, there is a temple on the hills and a school built in 1935.

References 

Populated coastal places in India
Villages in Khammam district